Koválov is a village and municipality in Senica District in the Trnava Region of western Slovakia.

History
In historical records the village was first mentioned in 1392.

Geography
The municipality lies at an altitude of 213 metres and covers an area of 13.620 km². It has a population of about 800 people.

Genealogical resources

The records for genealogical research are available at the state archive "Statny Archiv in Bratislava, Slovakia"

 Roman Catholic church records (births/marriages/deaths): 1668-1897 (parish A)

See also
 List of municipalities and towns in Slovakia

References

External links

 Official page
https://web.archive.org/web/20071027094149/http://www.statistics.sk/mosmis/eng/run.html
Surnames of living people in Kovalov

Villages and municipalities in Senica District